Eric de Sturler (born 15 January 1966, Groningen) is a Professor of Mathematics at Virginia Tech in Blacksburg, Virginia. He is on the editorial board of Applied Numerical Mathematics and the Open Applied Mathematics Journal.

Prof. de Sturler completed his Ph.D. under the direction of Henk van der Vorst at Technische Universiteit Delft in 1994. His thesis is entitled Iterative Methods on Distributive Memory Computers. He was a second-place winner of the Leslie Fox Prize for Numerical Analysis in 1997.
His research focuses on preconditioned iterative methods for solving linear and nonlinear systems, with applications in computational physics, material science, and mathematical biology.

References

External links
Eric de Sturler's personal webpage

1966 births
Living people
Dutch mathematicians
De Sturler, Eric 
De Sturler, Eric
Delft University of Technology alumni
Scientists from Groningen (city)
Dutch expatriates in the United States